Fabric 35 is a DJ mix compilation album by Ewan Pearson, as part of the Fabric Mix Series.

Track listing
  Jahcoozi – Ali McBills (Robert Johnson 6am X-Ray Italo Rework) – Careless
  Marc Ashken – Nimrod (Marc Houle Is A Nimrod Remix) – Leftroom
  Gui.tar – Push in the Bush – Careless
  Snax – Honeymoon's Over (Konrad Black Remix) – Terranova
  Jens Zimmermann – Tranquillité – K2
  Liquid Liquid – Bellhead – DFA
  Lee Burridge and Dan F – Treat 'em Mean, Keep 'em Keen (Exercise One, Mix 2) – Almost Anonymous
  100 Hz – Trustlove – Hi-Phen Music Delivery
  Samim – Paspd ft. Big Bully – Circus Company
  Laven & MSO – Looking For God – Klang
  Simon Baker – Plastik – Infant
  Samuel L Sessions ft. Paris The Black Fu – Can You Relate – Klap Klap
  Johannes Heil – All For One (Tobi Neumann's Swinging Remix) – Klang
  Kaos – Panopeeps (Origin) – Lektroluv
  Beanfield "Tides" – C's Movement #1 (Carl Craig Remix) – Compost
  Aril Brikha – Berghain – Kompakt

References

External links

Fabric: Fabric 35

Fabric (club) albums
2007 compilation albums